Allan Ling (1919-2006) was an Australian rugby league footballer who played in the 1940s.

Allan 'Snowy' Ling came from the Newcastle Rugby League competition to the St. George Dragons for one season in 1946.

During that year he played a couple of first grade games, but ultimately couldn't cement permanent first grade spot.

Ling died on 24 August 2006 at Soldiers Point, New South Wales aged 87.

References

Australian rugby league players
St. George Dragons players
Rugby league centres
1919 births
2006 deaths